GZR was an American heavy metal band founded by and named after Black Sabbath bassist/lyricist Geezer Butler. The band has been marketed with three different names on different releases, g//z/r in 1995, geezer in 1997, and GZR in 2005. Most fans refer to the band as "geezer," although Butler himself refers to the band name as "gee-zed-R". This incarnation of the band is not to be confused with Butler's previous attempt in 1985 to form a solo band, then known as the Geezer Butler Band – the two outfits are largely unrelated.

Band history
The band's music is generally of a much harder edge than Butler is known for in Black Sabbath. This is not a surprise, as the vocalist on his first album (Plastic Planet) was Burton C. Bell from Fear Factory, who is known for more driving and harder edged vocals than ever was displayed in Black Sabbath. Before taking on Bell as vocalist for the debut album Plastic Planet, Butler contacted Devin Townsend to perform vocals. However, due to Townsend's recent stint with Steve Vai, where he had not been a lyricist, he was unwilling to enter into another band where he would have no lyrical input. Plastic Planet also featured Pedro Howse, Butler's nephew, on guitars, as well as Deen Castronovo of Journey on drums. Bell did not stay with the band past the recording of Plastic Planet, due to Fear Factory commitments.

In 1996, the band re-emerged with an exclusive track for the Mortal Kombat: More Kombat compilation titled "Outworld", featuring Anger on Anger vocalist Mario Frasca. This proved to be a one-time collaboration as Frasca was replaced by Clark Brown from the band Symatic for GZR's second album, Black Science, released in 1997. The GZR formation played a few live dates in 1997 behind the release of the album, however, this was not a full-fledged tour, as most of the gigs were played concurrent to the Ozzfest tour of that year. The band opened for musicians like Bruce Dickinson who was playing some live gigs at the time. Castronovo recorded, but did not play any of the live gigs. He was replaced on drums by Chad Smith (not to be confused with the Red Hot Chili Peppers drummer with the same name).

Discography
1995: Plastic Planet
1997: Black Science
2005: Ohmwork
2021: The Very Best Of
2021: Manipulations of the Mind (The Complete Collection)

Appears on
"Mortal Kombat: Motion Picture Soundtrack" (1995) – performing "The Invisible"
"Mortal Kombat: More Kombat" (1996) – performing "Outworld"

Band members
Geezer Butler – bass, keyboards
Pedro Howse – guitars
Deen Castronovo – drums (1995–1997)
Burton C. Bell – vocals (1995)
Mario Frasca – vocals (1996) (credit only, "Outworld")
J.C. Stokes – vocals (1996) (uncredited, "Outworld")
Clark Brown – vocals (1997–2006)
Chad Smith – drums (1997–2006)
Lisa Rieffel – vocals (2005) (appearance only, "Pseudocide")

Timeline

References

External links
Geezer Butler's homepage
Geezer at Sanctuary Records
Geezer at TVT Records

Heavy metal musical groups from Texas
Musical groups established in 1995
Musical groups from Houston
Musical groups from Texas
Musical quartets
TVT Records artists